June Lorraine Matthews is an American nuclear physicist.

Career
June Lorraine Matthews was born August 1, 1939, to Mildred and Ralph Matthews and is the eldest granddaughter of Harlow Shapley.

Matthews completed her undergraduate degree in Physics at Carleton College, Northfield, Minnesota in 1960 and her PhD in 1967, titled The high energy nuclear photoeffect in light elements. She did postdoctoral fellowships at University of Glasgow, Scotland and Rutgers University, New Jersey. She became a member of staff at MIT in 1973. In 1984 she became a Fellow of the American Physical Society. From 1994 to 1998 she was Academic Officer in the Physics Department at MIT. In 2000 she was made director of Laboratory for Nuclear Science at MIT.

In 2021 she edited and released a memoir about her grandfather, Harlow Shapley, which had been written by her mother, Mildred Shapley Matthews.

Selected publications

Papers

Books edited

References

External links
 https://physics.mit.edu/faculty/june-matthews/

Living people
American women physicists
American nuclear physicists
Massachusetts Institute of Technology faculty
1939 births
Fellows of the American Physical Society